Murray Hill is an estate at 42910 Edwards Ferry Road, in Loudoun County, Virginia near Leesburg. The main house was built by Stirling Murray Rust, and is a conscious emulation of his family's homestead Rockland, located a few miles away. The estate is within the bounds of the theater of the American Civil War Battle of Ball's Bluff; artifacts related to military movements around the battle have been found on the property, as is a portion of a roadway used by Union forces.

The property was listed on the National Register of Historic Places in 2014.

See also
National Register of Historic Places listings in Loudoun County, Virginia

References

Houses completed in 1938
Houses on the National Register of Historic Places in Virginia
Houses in Loudoun County, Virginia
National Register of Historic Places in Loudoun County, Virginia
Leesburg, Virginia